The Badhuistheater (Dutch: Bath house theatre) is a theater venue located in a former bath house on the east-side of Amsterdam.

The theater is both a cultural meeting point for locals and a stage for international theatre productions. The theater is run by British actor and writer Michael Manicardi who acquired the neglected bath house around 1985 and transformed it into a theater. As a theater it seats between 50 and 150 audience, depending on the chosen configuration.

History
The building had a distinct circular shape around a central chimney. It was the first free standing communal bath house, build (in 1920) for this purpose. Its architecture is in the distinct “Amsterdamse school” style.
The building is a Dutch National monument (Dutch: Rijksmonument)

Since 2005 the Badhuistheater has its own theater-company: The Badhuis International Theatre. On a regular basis the bring new productions to the theater which they also bring to international festivals and other venues. More recently they produced pieces from Sean O'Casey Dublin Trilogy (The Shadow of a Gunman, Juno and the Paycock, The Plough and the Stars) and The Good Soldier Svejk after the books by Jaroslav Hašek.

References

External links
Official website Badhuistheater

Theatres in the Netherlands
Concert halls in Amsterdam
Rijksmonuments in Amsterdam